Eyes Down is a sitcom starring Paul O'Grady as Ray Temple, the manager of a bingo hall in Liverpool, England called The Rio, although the series was filmed in Rayners Lane in London. Although it had moderate ratings, the programme ran for two series until it was cancelled by the BBC in 2004. The show was written by Angela Clarke and directed by Christine Gernon.

Cast
Paul O'Grady – Ray Temple
Rosie Cavaliero – Christine
Tony Maudsley – Martin
Sheridan Smith – Sandy
Edna Doré – Mary
Hazel Douglas – Kathline
Neil Fitzmaurice – Bobby
Margaret John – Kay
Beatrice Kelley – Kitty
Eugene Salleh – Terry
Michelle Butterly – Pamela Henderson (Series 1)

Episode list

Series 1 (2003)

Series 2 (2004)

References

External links

2003 British television series debuts
2004 British television series endings
2000s British sitcoms
BBC television sitcoms
English-language television shows
Television shows set in Liverpool